Cryptocarya vulgaris is a species of shrub in the family Lauraceae. Found in tropical rainforest in Queensland in Australia, this species may grow to 6 metres tall.

References 

vulgaris
Plants described in 1989
Flora of Queensland